Partners of the Sunset is a 1948 American Western film directed by Lambert Hillyer and written by J. Benton Cheney. The film stars Jimmy Wakely, Dub Taylor, Christine Larson, Steve Darrell, Marshall Reed and Jay Kirby. The film was released on May 6, 1948 by Monogram Pictures.

Plot

Cast          
Jimmy Wakely as Jimmy Wakely
Dub Taylor as Cannonball
Christine Larson as Janice Thompson
Steve Darrell as Bill Thompson
Marshall Reed as Kirk Danvers
Jay Kirby as Dan Thompson
Leonard Penn as Les
J.C. Lytton as Town Marshal
Bob Woodward as Deputy Bob
Carl Mathews as Spike
Carl Sepulveda as Hashknife

References

External links
 

1948 films
American Western (genre) films
1948 Western (genre) films
Monogram Pictures films
Films directed by Lambert Hillyer
American black-and-white films
1940s English-language films
1940s American films